Elvin Aliyev (born 26 June 2000) is an Azerbaijani professional footballer who currently plays for Polotsk in the Belarusian Second League.

International career
Aliyev was called up for the Azerbaijan U19 on 4 October 2018.

References

External links
 
 
 FC Naftan profile

2000 births
Living people
Association football forwards
Azerbaijani footballers
Azerbaijani expatriate footballers
Expatriate footballers in Belarus
FC Naftan Novopolotsk players
FC Polotsk players